Circo or El Circo may refer to:

El circo, book by Ramón Gómez de la Serna
El circo (film), 1943 Mexican film
El circo (comics), a 1973 comic
Circo (band), Puerto Rico band
Circo, album by Nick Buzz 1997
Circo, album by  Darden Smith 2004
Circo: A Soundtrack by Calexico, album by Calexico
El circo (album), album by Maldita Vecindad 1991
 "El Circo", a remake of Red Foley's "Alabama Jubilee"
"El circo" (song), a 1996 song by Los Tigres del Norte